Sir Edward Hall Alderson,   (2 June 1864 – 7 March 1951) was a British public servant and Clerk of the Parliaments from 1930 to 1934.

Early life
Alderson was born on 2 June 1864 at New Zealand. He was a son of Francis John Alderson and Jane Irvin Black, a daughter of Dr. Thomas Black and Charlotte ( Leatham) Black.

He came a legal family; his grandfather, Sir Edward Hall Alderson, was a Baron of the Exchequer (whose daughter married Robert Gascoyne-Cecil, 3rd Marquess of Salisbury), and his great-grandfather, Robert Alderson, was Recorder of Norwich, Yarmouth and Ipswich.

He attended Brasenose College, Oxford, before he was called to the bar in 1890.

Career
He practised on the South-Eastern Circuit only briefly, being appointed private secretary to Lord Halsbury in 1895. Five years later, he was appointed Reading Clerk and Clerk of Outdoor Committees of the House of Lords. Promotions followed: in 1917 to Clerk-Assistant, and in 1930 to Clerk of the Parliaments. He retired in 1934.

Appointed a Companion of the Order of the Bath in 1919, Alderson went on to receive two knighthoods, as a Knight Commander of the Order of the British Empire six years later, and then as a Knight Commander of the Order of the Bath in 1931.

Personal life
Alderson married Mary Emily Bonsor, daughter of Sir Cosmo Bonsor, 1st Baronet and the former Emily Gertrude Fellowes. Before her death in 1935, they were the parents of three children, including:

 Richard Cosmo Alderson (1906–1944), who was killed in action in Italy during World War II; he married Gillian Mary Barrington, a daughter of merchant banker Hon. Bernard Barrington and sister to Patrick Barrington, 11th Viscount Barrington.

He died on 7 March 1951; two children from their marriage survived him.

References 

1864 births
1951 deaths
English barristers
Alumni of Brasenose College, Oxford
Knights Commander of the Order of the Bath
Knights Commander of the Order of the British Empire
Clerks of the Parliaments